The 2011–12 CHL season was the 20th season of the Central Hockey League (CHL).

League business

Team changes
The Bossier-Shreveport Mudbugs, Colorado Eagles (who moved to the ECHL), Mississippi RiverKings (who moved to the Southern Professional Hockey League), Bloomington PrairieThunder, and the Odessa Jackalopes all left the league.

A new team, the Bloomington Blaze joined the league and will play in the Turner Conference.

Realignment
Announced on June 14, 2011, the league realigned their conferences with the loss of five teams and the addition of one team. The notable changes are the addition of Bloomington to the Turner Conference and Wichita Thunder to the Berry Conference.

Regular season

Conference standings

Playoffs

Playoff bracket

CHL Awards
Source:Central Hockey League Historical Award Winners

All-CHL Team
Source:CHL Media Relations
Shawn Limpright, Forward, Rapid City Rush
Brandon Marino, Forward, Quad City Mallards
Todd Robinson, Forward, Evansville IceMen
Frankie DeAngelis, Defense, Fort Wayne Komets
Riley Weselowski, Defense, Rapid City Rush
Mark Guggenberger, Goal, Texas Brahmas

References

External links
Central Hockey League website

 
2011-12
CHL